Nikos Iliadis (born 27 February 1951) is a Greek weightlifter. He competed at the 1972, 1976, 1980 and the 1984 Summer Olympics. He was named the 1976 and 1977 Greek Male Athlete of the Year.

References

1951 births
Living people
Greek male weightlifters
Olympic weightlifters of Greece
Weightlifters at the 1972 Summer Olympics
Weightlifters at the 1976 Summer Olympics
Weightlifters at the 1980 Summer Olympics
Weightlifters at the 1984 Summer Olympics
Place of birth missing (living people)
20th-century Greek people
21st-century Greek people